Francesc de Borja Moll Casanovas (10 October 1903 – 18 February 1991) was a catalan linguist, philologist and editor from Menorca. He wrote many books on the Catalan language and its varieties spoken on the Balearic Islands. He was also the main collaborator with Father Antoni Maria Alcover in his Diccionari Català-Valencià-Balear.

Biography 
Moll was born in 1903 in Ciutadella de Menorca, Balearic Islands, Spain. His father was called Josep Moll Vidal and his mother Maria-Anna Casanovas Oliver. He was the 7th child of their humble marriage. However the first 5 children of the family died before they reached 5 years old; and for this reason, Francesc was an extremely protected child. In his book Els meus primers trenta anys he states that both his mother and father, together with his godmother and brother were the most important figures in his life.

Between 1908 and 1911, he learnt to read and write with his teacher, Miquel Villalonga, and he began to learn basic drawing skills. His father also played a part in his education, enforcing his love for the Catalan language. In 1912 he enrolled in a school of theology in Cituadella de Menorca and he began his studies; he focused on the humanities and specialised in Latin. His degree was taught entirely through the medium of Spanish, the most used language at the time. For this reason, in the book mentioned above, Francesc de Borja Moll, remembering his first years at the school of theology, admits that he doesn't remember the Seminary ever teaching them about their mother tongue, its history or culture. He also admits that they were never taught about Catalan literature and how to write it. Thanks to the lecturers, he knew who Verdaguer was. But that is all, he wasn't happy with any other aspect of his education. As a result, when he began to write professionally he couldn't imagine doing it in the language from Menorca.

The arrival of Father Alcover at the Seminary in Cituadella was a great moment in his life. Alcover had travelled to Menorca with the intention of learning about the different dialects of the island and to incorporate them into his dictionary that he was writing at the time, the Catalan-Valencian-Balearic dictionary, which, later on, Moll would also before the co-writer of. Although he didn't study at university, the collaboration with Anthony Alcover allowed him to meet German linguists such as Meyer Lübke, Leo Spitzer and Bernhard Schädel. In 1921 he moved to Mallorca to work on the dictionary. In 1932, when Alcover died, Moll continued writing the dictionary and the Bolletí to which he applied the orthographical norms of Fabra –which Alcover hadn't used because he was in disagreement with the Institute of Catalan Studies.

The strong personality of his teacher, who played an important role in his Catalan studies, caused a lot of problems with other linguists, in fact he almost discredited the launch of the Catalan-Valencian-Balearic dictionary. At the time, they didn't write neither reviews of the DCVB nor was there any mention by IEC (the institute of Catalan Studies), the biggest linguistic organisation at the time. In fact, the dictionary was edited thanks to Alcover's efforts as he created his own editorial, which later would become Editorial Moll.

His life was full highs and lows but one of his lowest moments was when the Spanish Civil War broke out. Moll was called to serve the state against the nationalists.

Moll's main aim was to make Catalan more appreciated and widely taught. In fact, most of his work focused on grammar, vocabulary and Catalan language courses. His contribution and dedication to l’Obra Cultural Balear was also very noteworthy.

Moll died in Palma de Mallorca on 18 February 1991. His life was completely dedicated to studying and promoting the Catalan language. Despite winning many awards, honours and distinctions, he continued to be a very humble and hard working man.

Main works 

 Suplement català al "Romanisches etymologisches wörterbuch" (1931)
 Cançons populars mallorquines (1934)
 Rudiments de gramàtica normativa (1952)
 Gramàtica històrica catalana (1952)
 Els llinatges catalans (1959)
 Un home de combat: Mossèn Alcover (1962)
 Epistolari del Bisbe Carsalade a Mossèn Alcover (1965)
 Cinc temes menorquins (1979)
 Els meus primers trenta anys 1903-1934 (1970)
 Polèmica d'en Pep Gonella (1972).
 L'home per la paraula (1974)
 Els altres quaranta anys 1935-1974 (1975)
 Diccionari Català-Castellà (1977)
 Diccionari Castellà-Català (1978)
 El parlar de Mallorca (1980)
 Textos i estudis medievals (1982)
 Aspectes marginals d'un home de combat (Mossèn Alcover) (1983)
 "Autobiografía intelectual", Anthropos 44, 1984, p. 7.
 "L'aventura editorial d'un filòleg", Anthropos44, 1984, p. 17.
 Curso breve de español para extranjeros: elemental (1991)
 Curso breve de español para extranjeros: superior (1991)
 Promptuari d'ortografia (1999)
 Epistolari Joan Coromines-Francesc de Borja Moll (2000)
 Diccionari escolar Català-Castellà, Castellà-Català (2001)
 Exercicis de gramàtica
 Gramàtica catalana
 Llengua de les Balears 1
 Llengua de les Balears 2

References

Linguists from Spain
1991 deaths
1903 births
Premi d'Honor de les Lletres Catalanes winners
Academic staff of the University of the Balearic Islands
Members of the Institute for Catalan Studies
Lexicographers of Catalan
20th-century lexicographers